Jean Robert (June 25, 1908, Brussels - February 28, 1981, Hilversum) was a Belgian jazz saxophonist.

Robert started out on piano before switching to tenor saxophone, and played early in his career with Peter Packay, Gus Deloof, Chas Remue, and Albert Sykes. By 1933 he was leading his own band at a Brussels club called the Atlanta, and also worked with Freddie Beerman and Robert De Kers around the same time. Later in the decade he played in the Netherlands with Freddy Johnson and Jascha Trabsky, and during World War II worked in Jean Omer's band and with Lutz Templin. After the war, he played with Omer into the 1960s. He spent the latter years of his life in Hilversum, in the Netherlands, having retired from active performance; however, he continued to do arrangement and composition work.

References
Robert Pernet, "Jean Robert". The New Grove Dictionary of Jazz. 2nd edition, ed. Barry Kernfeld.

Belgian jazz saxophonists
Belgian composers
Male composers
Musicians from Brussels
1908 births
1981 deaths
20th-century saxophonists
20th-century Belgian male musicians